Justyn Pogue is an American artist and musician born in Olympia, Washington.

He has contributed his musical and visual artistic talents to several releases by Phil Elvrum's band, The Microphones (now known as Phil Elverum aka Mount Eerie).

Pogue writes music and sings with the Portland, Oregon, band Vacant Stares as of 2021. He is primarily credited for his artwork as J.pogue, and often as Justin Pogue.

Among his artistic resume, Pogue's artwork is featured on Up Records catalog number 64 and the K Records video compilation entitled Black Eye, as well as releases by Retch (Japan), Desire Beat, Shadowhouse, Vacant Stares, and design for Harshaura records. 

In 2009, Justyn Pogue released an experimental/noise album under the name Afterlives.

References

American bass guitarists
Living people
Year of birth missing (living people)